James Blaine "Blainey" Hall (born January 17, 1889 and died March 1975) was a Negro leagues outfielder and manager for several years before the founding of the first Negro National League, and in its first few seasons.

Hall managed the Baltimore Black Sox in 1923.

He died in Baltimore, Maryland at the age of 86.

References

External links
 and Baseball-Reference Black Baseball stats and Seamheads
  and Seamheads

Negro league baseball managers
Lincoln Giants players
Brooklyn Royal Giants players
Baltimore Black Sox players
Baseball players from Baltimore
1889 births
1975 deaths
20th-century African-American people